Micrurus medemi is a species of coral snake in the family Elapidae. Specimens have been identified mostly in Meta Department. It was named after Friedrich Johann Graf von Medem.

References 

medemi
Snakes of South America
Reptiles of Colombia
Reptiles described in 1967